Two Lines Oblique: San Diego is an outdoor 1993 stainless steel sculpture by George Rickey, installed in the San Diego Museum of Art's May S. Marcy Sculpture Garden, in the U.S. state of California.

See also
 1993 in art

References

1993 sculptures
Outdoor sculptures in San Diego
Sculptures of the San Diego Museum of Art
Stainless steel sculptures in the United States
Steel sculptures in California